Football Federation of Kyiv (FFK) is a football governing body in the region of Kyiv city, Ukraine. The federation is a  collective member of the Football Federation of Ukraine. 

The city competitions separate from the Kyiv region started sometimes in mid 1930s with establishment of the city committee in physical culture and sports. However the first recorded official competitions started earlier just before the WWI in 1911 with creation of the Kiev Football League which existed until 1924. Following the disbandment of the Kiev Football League as a "heritage of the Tsarist regime", football competitions were conducted under auspices of regional council of physical culture gubernatorial and, after liquidations of gubernias, okruha (districtal). Due to inconsistency in conducting football competitions, in second half of 1920s they were organized by the Kyiv Trade Union council.

Clubs from Kyiv city sometimes compete in the championship of Kyiv Oblast and vice versa clubs from Kyiv Oblast sometimes compete in the championship of Kyiv city.

List of champions

1911    Politekhniki
1912    Sport
1913    Lyubiteli Sporta
1914    Lyubiteli Sporta
1915    Sport
1916    Politekhniki
1917    no competition
1918    Maccabi
1919    not finished due to war
1920    Ukrainian-Soviet War
1921(s) 1. KSK of Lenin
1921(f) 1. KSK of Lenin
1922(s) Zheldor
1922(f) Zheldor
1923(s) Zheldor
1923(f) Zheldor
1924(s) Zheldor
1924(f) Zheldor
1925(s) no competition
1925(f) Zheldor
1926(s) Zheldor
1926(f) Zheldor
1927(s) Raikomvod
1927(f) Zheldor
1928    Raikomvod
1929    Raikomvod
1930    Mestran
1931    not finished
1932    no competition
1933    no competition
1934    Zheldor
1935    Zheldor
1936(s) ???
1936(f) ???
1937(s) KO DKA
1937(f) ???
1938(s) ???
1938(f) Dynamo
1939(s) ???
1939(f) ???
1940    Dynamo
1941    not finished
1942-44 World War II
1945    Red Banner Artillery School
1946    Lokomotyv
1947    Lokomotyv
1948    ???
1949    ODO
1950    Lokomotyv
1951    Lokomotyv
1952    ???
1953    Pecherskyi District
1954    Zenit
1955    Dynamo
1956    Zhovtnevyi District
1957    Bilshovyk
1958    Zhovtnevyi District
1959    Bilshovyk
1960    Zhovtnevyi District
1961    SC Temp
1962    SC Temp
1963    ???
1964    Bilshovyk
1965    Bilshovyk
1966    ???
1967    SC Temp
1968    ???
1969    Bilshovyk
1970    Bilshovyk
1971    Bilshovyk
1972    Bilshovyk
1973    Bilshovyk
1974    ???
1975    SC Arsenal
1976    Skhid
1977    Bilshovyk
1978    Bilshovyk
1979    Bilshovyk
1980    Bilshovyk
1981    ???
1982    ???
1983    ???
1984    Skhid
1985    ???
1986    Bilshovyk
1987    ???
1988    Verstatobudivnyk
1989    Metalist
1990    ???
1991    ???
1992-93 Zmina-Obolon
1993-94 Druzhba
1994-95 Lokomotyv
1995-96 Dynamo-3
1996-97 Dynamo-3
1997-98 ???
1998-99 ATEK
1999-00 Dnipro
2000-01 Kyiv
2001-02 ATEK
2002-03 Arsenal
2003    Sport School 15
2004    Alians
2005    OMIKS
2006    Alians
2007    Zirka
2008    Zirka
2009    Zirka
2010    Zirka
2011    Zirka
2012    Zirka
2013    Budstar Grup
2014    Arsenal-Kyiv
2015    Arsenal-Kyiv
2016    Mezhyhiria Novi Petrivtsi
2017    Lokomotyv
2017-18 Mezhyhiria Novi Petrivtsi
2018-19 Lehia
2019-20 Mezhyhiria Novi Petrivtsi

Cup winners

1939    Dynamo
1940    Lokomotyv
1941    Lokomotyv
1942-43 World War II
1944    no competition
1945    no competition
1946    Dynamo
1947    Dynamo
1948    ???
1949    ODO
1950    Lokomotyv
1951    ODO
1952    Bilshovyk
1953    Arsenal
1954    Mashynobudivnyk
1955    ???
1956    Mashynobudivnyk
1957    Darnytsia Carriage Works
1958    Bilshovyk
1959    Bilshovyk
1960    Bilshovyk
1961    Bilshovyk
1962    Temp
1963    Bilshovyk
1964    Bilshovyk
1965    Bilshovyk
1966    Bilshovyk
1967    Bilshovyk
1968    Bilshovyk
1969    Bilshovyk
1970    Bilshovyk
1971    Bilshovyk
1972    Bilshovyk
1973    Bilshovyk
1974    Arsenal
1975    Bilshovyk
1976    Bilshovyk
1977    Chervonyi Ekskavator
1978    Bilshovyk
1979    Skhid
1980    Bilshovyk
1981    Skhid
1982    Skhid
1983    Skhid
1984    Skhid
1985    ???
1986    ???
1987    Bilshovyk
1988    Skhid
1989    ???
1990    Skhid
1991    Skhid
1992    Dynamo-3
1993    Zmina-Obolon
1994    Zmina-Obolon
1995    Dynamo-3
1996    Interkas
1997    Yevrobis
1998    ???
1999    ???
2001    ???
2002    ???
2003    Sport School 15
2004    Dnipro
2005    Alians
2006    Alians
2007-08 Kyiv
2008    Zirka
2009    Zirka
2010    Batkivshchyna
2011    Kyiv
2012    Batkivshchyna
2013    Batkivshchyna
2014    FC Mezhyhiria Novi Petrivtsi
2015    FC Mezhyhiria Novi Petrivtsi
2016    FC Dinaz Vyshhorod
2017    
2018

Professional clubs

Men's clubs
 FC Dynamo Kyiv, 1936-1941, 1944-present
 
 
 FC Lokomotyv Kyiv, 1936-1940, 1946
 FC Spartak Kyiv, 1937, 1946, 1949
 FC CSKA Kyiv (ODO, SKVO, SKA, SC Chernihiv, ZS Oriyana, CSK ZSU, CSKA-2), 1946-1949, 1952-1958, 1961-1987, 1990-2009
 FC Arsenal Kyiv, 1959-1963
 FC Temp Kyiv, 1964
 FC Arsenal-Kyiv Kyiv (FC Boryspil, Borysfen, CSKA-Borysfen, CSKA, Arsenal), 1993-2013, 2015-2019
 
 FC Obolon Kyiv (Obolon-Brovar, Obolon-PPO), 1993-present
 
 FC Rubikon Kyiv, 2020-
 AFSC Kyiv, 2021
 FC Livyi Bereh Kyiv, 2021

Women's clubs
 Dynamo Kyiv, 1989-1994
 Alina Kyiv (Radosin Kyiv), 1990-1997
 Arena Kyiv, 1989-1993
 Tornado Kyiv (Nyva Baryshivka, Olimp Kyiv), 1989-1993
 Ateks Kyiv, 2003-2007, 2009-2018, 2021-22
 Spartak Kyiv, 1995
 Kyivska Rus Kyiv, 1999-2001
 Sotstekh Kyiv, 2004
 Oleksandriya Kyiv, 2003
 Slavia Kyiv, 2003

See also
 FFU Council of Regions
 Kyiv Oblast Football Federation

References

External links
 Official website
 История футбольных клубов (УКРАИНА. КИЕВ). lena-dvorkina.narod.ru

Football in the regions of Ukraine
Football governing bodies in Ukraine
Sport in Kyiv